Odesa National University of Economics (ONEU) – one of the leading universities in Ukraine, founded in 1921 with the aim of training highly qualified specialists in economics, conducting research overall spectrum of economic problems.

History 
On May 16, 1921, the Odesa Provincial Executive Committee issued an order to establish the Odesa Institute of National Economy. The founders of the university's scientific school were such outstanding scientists as: Victor Moritzovich Shtein, Alexei Yakovlevich Shpakov, Anton Samoilovich Borinevich, Grigory Isakovich Titikin, Sergei Ivanovich Solntsev, and Gavrilo Ivanovich Tanfiliev.

Recognition of Odesa National Economic University:

 1971 – Odesa Institute of National Economy (the old name) was awarded with the Certificate of Honor of the Presidium of the Supreme Council of the Ukrainian SSR for the success in training highly skilled professionals for the national economy and in connection with the 50th anniversary of the university foundation.
 1993 – The Cabinet of Ministers of Ukraine appreciated the achievements and merits of the Odesa Institute of National Economy stuff and established the Odesa State Economic University on its basis.
 1997 – Odesa State University of Economics was admitted to the European Association of Universities.
 2001, 2006 – the staff of the Odesa State Economic University was awarded twice with the Certificate of Honor by the Ukraine Cabinet of Ministers for the training of highly skilled professionals.
 2010 – joining the Odesa State Economic University to the Grand Charter of the Universities of the World with headquarters in Bologna.
 2011 – By the order of the President of Ukraine No. 1041/2011 of November 11, 2011, the university was granted a national status.

Nowadays University consists of 6 campuses and 3 hostels located in the downtown of Odesa.

Academics 
The scientific staff of the university is about 500 people of the faculty, 55% of them have a scientific degree, including 36 professors, doctors of science. The university employs 9 academicians, 4 honored workers of education, scientists and engineers. This allows to carry out successfully fundamental and applied scientific research on the priority directions of science and technology development.

Integration of the Odesa State Economic University into the world educational space is confirmed by the membership in the European Association of Universities. The high international rating of the university team allows us cooperate with 49 educational and scientific institutions of the CIS, Germany, Mexico, Israel, Austria, Holland, Italy, Romania, the Czech Republic, Bulgaria, Poland, France, etc.

Teachers and students take part in various international programs and projects such as EU DAAD, USAID, SIFE, TEMPUS-TACIS, AISEC and others. On September 14, 2010, rector of the University M.I. Zveriakov signed the Grand Charter of Universities in one of the oldest Bologna University in Europe. This provides recognition of our university in Europe. The European Union Ambassador in Ukraine, Jose Pinto Teixeira, opened the Information Center of the European Union at our University. The university is included in the register of European universities operating in the context of the Bologna system on the principles of openness and mobility. The International Department of the university is successfully working on the programs of double bachelor diplomas and student exchange. Concluded agreements with the universities of Strasbourg (France) and Mittwayde (Germany).

Altogether 10,000 students, postgraduates, doctoral students and applicants study at the university and its departments including citizens from Vietnam, Ecuador, Israel, China, Cyprus, Congo, Moldova, Mongolia, Turkmenistan, etc.

Departments
The university is structured into 5 day-time departments:

 Faculty of Economics and Enterprise Management
 Finance and economics faculty
 Accounting and economics faculty
 Credit and economics faculty
 Faculty of international economy

See also
 Open access in Ukraine

External links
 Homepage of the OSEU

 
Universities of economics in Europe
1921 establishments in Ukraine
Educational institutions established in 1921
National universities in Ukraine